Hatata (/hɑːˈtɑːtə/; Ge'ez: ሐተታ ḥätäta "inquiry") is a Ge'ez term describing an investigation and refers to two 17th century ethical and rational philosophical treatises in Ethiopia. 

It may also refer to:

  Hatata, island located west of Ambon, Indonesia
 Magdy Hatata (born 1941), Egyptian military officer
 Sherif Hatata (1923–2017), Egyptian doctor, author and communist activist

See also